Chief Justice Eyre may refer to:

Sir James Eyre (judge), Chief Justice of the Common Pleas, 1793–1799
Sir Robert Eyre, Chief Justice of the Common Pleas, 1725–1735

See also
Justice Eyre (disambiguation)
Justice in eyre, the highest magistrates in English law
Justice Ayre, judicial circuit north and south of the River Forth in Scotland